Giovanni Francesco Romanelli (Viterbo, 1610– Viterbo, 1662) was a major Italian painter of the Baroque period, celebrated for his use of bright, vivid colors and also for his clarity of detail. Many of his works are on display in the Louvre.

Biography
Romanelli was trained in Rome in the studio of Pietro da Cortona, the leading painter of his day.

Born in Viterbo to Laura de Angelis and Bartolomeo Romanelli, he went to Rome at age 14 to study to become an artist, and within a few years became part of the household of Cardinal Francesco Barberini. He was a pupil in the painting studio of Pietro da Cortona, the leading painter of his day, but the two eventually quarreled and so Romanelli left. In 1639 he was elected director of the prestigious Academy of Saint Luke. With the death of Urban VIII and the accession of Innocent X, the Barberini family fell from favour and Romanelli's patronage ebbed.

He was then summoned to work in Paris by Cardinal Mazarin, for whom he painted a fresco cycle based on Ovid's Metamorphoses. He also painted the Salle des Saisons and the Queen's Cabinet of the Louvre for Anne of Austria, mother of Louis XIV. In France he was made a knight of the Order of St. Michael by King Louis XIV.

Romanelli’s pupils included his son Urbano Romanelli and the painter from Visone, Giovanni Monevi.

Among his paintings are Deposition from the Cross in Sant'Ambrogio della Massima, Presentation in the Temple, which was transferred to a mosaic altarpiece for the Basilica of St. Peter’s (now in the Santa Maria degli Angeli), and Venus Pouring a Balm on the Wound of Aeneas, on display in the Louvre. He also painted The Israelites gathering up Manna (Louvre); The Finding of Moses (Indianapolis Museum of Art); and a "Sibilla" in the Museo di Capodimonte of Naples.

References

Artnet biography

1610 births
1662 deaths
People from the Province of Viterbo
17th-century Italian painters
Italian male painters
Italian Baroque painters